Joseph M. Neal Jr. (July 28, 1935 – December 31, 2020) was an American politician who served as a Democratic member of the Nevada Senate from 1973 to 2004, making him the first African-American state senator in Nevada. He served as Minority Floor leader in 1989 and as President pro tempore in 1991.

Early life
Born in Mound, Louisiana, he served in the United States Air Force. Neal moved to Nevada in 1964 and earned a degree in political science and history from Southern University.

Political career
Neal was inducted into the Nevada Senate Hall of Fame in 2005, a year into his retirement. At the time of his retirement, he was the longest-serving state senator in the history of the state. In 2002, Neal ran unsuccessfully for Governor of Nevada.

Personal life and death
Neal married Estelle Ann DeConge in 1965 and together, they had 5 children: Charisse, Tania, Withania, Dina Amelia, and Joseph. Estelle died of breast cancer in 1997. Dina Neal served as a member of the Nevada Assembly from 2010 to 2020, when she took her father's former seat in the Nevada Senate.

Neal died on December 31, 2020, after a long illness. He was 85 years old.

References

1935 births
2020 deaths
20th-century African-American people
21st-century African-American people
African-American state legislators in Nevada
Military personnel from Louisiana
Democratic Party Nevada state senators
People from Madison Parish, Louisiana
Southern University alumni